Park Sang-min (born October 9, 1970) is a South Korean actor. He is best known for Im Kwon-taek's General's Son trilogy and his roles in numerous television dramas such as My Lovely Fool and Giant.

Park has had run-ins with the law: a drunk driving arrest in 2011, and a domestic violence charge in 2012.

Filmography

Television series 
 2019: Possessed (OCN)
 2017: Bravo My Life (SBS)
 2013: The Scandal (MBC)
 2013: Incarnation of Money (SBS)
 2012: God of War (MBC)
 2011: City Hunter (SBS)
 2011: I Trusted Men (MBC)
 2010: Giant (SBS)
 2008: Our Happy Ending (MBC)
 2008: The Great King, Sejong (KBS)
 2007: Bad Couple (SBS)
 2007: By My Side (MBC)
 2006: My Lovely Fool (SBS)
 2001: Women's World (SBS)
 2000: Full of Sun (KBS)
 2000: Virtue (SBS)
 2000: Meeting (KBS)
 1999: Young Sun (SBS)
 1999: Did We Really Love? (MBC)
 1996: The Brothers' River (SBS)
 1995: Our Sunny Days of Youth (KBS2)
 1994: Love is Blue (SBS)

Film 
 2009: City of Damnation
 2003: Tube
 2002: The Hidden Princess
 1998: Man's Story
 1997: Sky Doctor
 1997: Maria and the Inn
 1996: Hoodlum Lessons
 1996: Come to Me
 1995: 48+1
 1995: Thief and a Poet
 1995: Bitter and Sweet
 1993: No Emergency Exit
 1992: General's Son III
 1992: A Woman Who Doesn't Divorce
 1991: General's Son II
 1990: General's Son

Awards 
 2013 Korean Culture and Entertainment Awards: Top Excellence Award, Actor in Drama (The Scandal)
 2010 SBS Drama Awards: Producer's Award (Giant)
 2000 KBS Drama Awards: Excellence Award, Actor (Full of Sun)
 1995 Baeksang Arts Awards: Most Popular Actor in Film (Bitter and Sweet)
 1991 Blue Dragon Film Awards: Popular Star Award (General's Son II)
 1991 Grand Bell Awards: Best New Actor (General's Son)
 1990 Blue Dragon Film Awards: Popular Star Award (General's Son)
 1990 Blue Dragon Film Awards: Best New Actor (General's Son)

References

External links 
 
 
 

1970 births
Living people
21st-century South Korean male actors
South Korean male television actors
South Korean male film actors